KGLL (88.1 MHz) is a radio station licensed to Gillette, Wyoming, broadcasting a Catholic talk format, and is an owned and operated affiliate of Real Presence Radio.

History
KGLL began broadcasting in 2010. It was originally owned by American Family Association, and was an affiliate of American Family Radio's AFR Talk network. Effective May 21, 2018, the station was sold to Real Presence Radio for $50,000.

References

External links
Real Presence Radio's website

Radio stations established in 2010
2010 establishments in Wyoming
Catholic radio stations
GLL